Henri Kastler (13 May 1863 – 13 November 1957) was a French philatelist who was added to the Roll of Distinguished Philatelists in 1947. Kastler was the first president of the Academy of Philately.

References

Signatories to the Roll of Distinguished Philatelists
1863 births
1956 deaths
French philatelists